Blairmore School was an independent boarding preparatory school in Glass near Huntly, Aberdeenshire until its closure in 1993. The site is now owned and used by a Christian organisation called Ellel Ministries International as a prayer, training and healing retreat centre.

History
Blairmore School was established in 1947 as an independent prep school for boys aged 8–13 by Colonel D.R. Ainslie D.S.O., B.A., a keen educationalist, Cambridge graduate and retired Seaforth Highlander. The school turned co-ed in 1975.

Pupil numbers peaked at 90 in 1989 but the economic recession of the early 1990s caused a decline in UK prep school subscriptions and in June 1993, with fewer than 30 pupils enrolled for the coming academic year, Blairmore became impossible to sustain financially and the school was forced to close.

Culture
The school was small and isolated in the country. Pupils were encouraged to spend time outdoors, taking advantage of the school's extensive grounds and rural surroundings. Daily sports were an integral part of the curriculum, while Scouting and camping were a key part of Blairmore life. Blairmore had its own riding school and stables at some stage, a woodland assault course, a ski-slope and Britain's only school ski tow.

In the evenings and at weekends, the woodlands around the school provided an ideal playground for the young boys and girls. Dressed in their "Woods Clothes" (as casual clothes were known), pupils played conkers, climbed trees and constructed dens, known as "cols" (short for colonies), from which raids were launched against rival groups.

Features
The school was divided into four houses, named after rivers in the North-East of Scotland: Deveron (red), Dee (green), Spey (yellow) and Don (blue).

Boarders slept in dormitories in the main school building, although for a period senior boys were accommodated in the neighbouring Glebe House. Dormitories were originally given simple topographical names but were later renamed with an ornithological theme. The boys' dorms included: Tower (which became Buzzard), South (Eagle), East (Harrier). The girls' dorms were: Side (Lapwing), Middle (Heron), Back (Plover). The dormitories in Glebe House were given local place names: Cairnie, Cabrach, Botriphinie.

Blairmore had its own tartan.

The school had a long-standing rivalry with nearby Aberlour House. Other regular sporting opponents included Drumtochty Castle, Rannoch School, Croftinloan School, Lathallan School, Gordonstoun, Peterhead Academy, Ardvreck School, Aberdeen Academy, Aberdeen Grammar School and The Gordon Schools, Huntly.

Headmasters
 1947–1962 Colonel David Ronald Ainslie DSO
 1962–1967 Lt. Colonel Frank W Collard
 1967–1987 Dan Latham
 1987–1990 Andrew Keith
 1990–1993 Duncan Hepburn

Former pupils

 Ken Ballantyne (1940–2016), Scottish athlete.
 Malcolm Sinclair, 20th Earl of Caithness (born 1948), Conservative politician.
 Grenville Johnston (born 1945), accountant and Lord Lieutenant of Moray.
 David Sole (born 1962), Scottish rugby union captain.

Blairmore House
The house was designed by the architect Alexander Marshall Mackenzie and was built in 1884 as a private house for Alexander Geddes, a wealthy businessman and great-great grandfather of the former British Prime Minister David Cameron. Cameron's father, Ian Donald Cameron, was born in the house in 1932. Geddes made his fortune in Chicago in the US in the trading of grain in the 1850s, and a safe belonging to him which survived the Great Fire of Chicago was installed in the house's Billiard Room. During the Second World War it served as GHQ Home Forces for some of the Auxiliary Units based in Aberdeenshire and had a training area within the grounds of the house and nearby land. Auxunit Patrols was a special force consisting of between six and eight men trained in the utmost secrecy to a high standard. In the event of a German invasion, they would go to ground and carry out a clandestine war against the occupying forces.

After the school's closure, Blairmore House was run as a private hunting lodge for several years. The building is now used as a prayer and intercession training school and retreat centre run by an evangelical Christian group called Ellel Ministries.

Blairmore House is a Category C listed building.

See also
 Cademuir International School
 Oxenfoord Castle School
 Rannoch School
 St Margaret's School, Edinburgh
 Blairmore Holdings

Footnotes

Defunct boarding schools in Scotland
Defunct schools in Aberdeenshire
Defunct preparatory schools in Scotland
Defunct private schools in Scotland